Kaylin Hsieh Sin-yan (born 19 May 2001) is a Hong Kong fencer. She won one of the bronze medals in the women's team épée event at the 2018 Asian Games held in Jakarta, Indonesia. In 2021, she represented Hong Kong at the 2020 Summer Olympics in Tokyo, Japan.

In 2018, she also won the silver medal in the girls' épée event at the Summer Youth Olympics held in Buenos Aires, Argentina. At the opening ceremony of the 2018 Summer Youth Olympics she carried the flag for Hong Kong.

At the 2018 Asian Fencing Championships in Bangkok, Thailand, she won one of the bronze medals in the women's individual épée event. She also won the silver medal in the women's team épée event. In 2019, she won the bronze medal in the women's team épée at the Asian Fencing Championships held in Chiba, Japan.

In 2021, she competed in the women's épée event at the 2020 Summer Olympics in Tokyo, Japan where she was eliminated in her first match by Aizanat Murtazaeva of the ROC.

References

External links 
 

Living people
2001 births
Place of birth missing (living people)
Hong Kong female épée fencers
Fencers at the 2018 Asian Games
Medalists at the 2018 Asian Games
Asian Games bronze medalists for Hong Kong
Asian Games medalists in fencing
Fencers at the 2018 Summer Youth Olympics
Medalists at the 2018 Summer Youth Olympics
Fencers at the 2020 Summer Olympics
Olympic fencers of Hong Kong
21st-century Hong Kong women